Luton Airport is a British reality TV series which follows staff at London Luton Airport, the fourth airport of the London area and a hub for low-cost carriers such as EasyJet and Ryanair.

The show followed the airport duty managers and operations personnel as the airport moved through a phase of redevelopment. No specific airline was focused on though many were seen throughout the series.

Staff featured on TV show
Airport Duty Managers: Steve Garrett, Liam Bolger, Steve Stewart, Yvonne Jakins (also Airport Re-development Project Manager later Head of Security)
General Managers: Kim Godliman (Passenger Services), Steve Birchall (Airport Security), Roger Koukkoulis (Airfield Operations)
Terminal Duty Officers: Melanie Horwood, Patrick Sammon, Kevin Aldridge
Other Duty Officers: Lisa Woods (Security), Martyn Hooton (Operations)
Passenger Services Assistants: Marta Barbero, Sudih Asha, Marion, Frederick

Production status
Series 1 - 10 editions. First broadcast in 2005 on ITV London and then repeated on Sky Real Lives and Sky3.
Series 2 - 9 editions. The first series had mild success, and a new series started on ITV London on 9 May 2006.
Series 3 - 9 editions. Broadcast on ITV London in mid-2008.

External links
 

2005 British television series debuts
2008 British television series endings
Documentary television series about aviation
English-language television shows
ITV reality television shows
Luton Airport
Television series by ITV Studios
Transport in Luton/Dunstable Urban Area
2000s British reality television series